The Price to Pay may refer to:

 The Price to Pay (book), 2012 autobiography by Joseph Fadelle
 The Price to Pay (film), 2007 French comedy film
 The Price to Pay, 1996 TVB series